Risoba basalis is a species of moth of the family Nolidae first described by Frederic Moore in 1882.

Distribution
It is found in India, the Philippines, Taiwan, Vietnam, Sundaland and Sulawesi.

Biology
The larvae have been recorded feeding on Melastoma and Quisualis species.

References

Nolidae
Moths of Japan
Moths described in 1882